Extractions is the third studio album by English band Dif Juz, released in 1985 by record label 4AD.

It was released on 1 July 1985.

Recording
Extractions was recorded from 6–20 April 1985 at Palladium Studios, Edinburgh, with Robin Guthrie of Cocteau Twins as producer and Keith Mitchell as engineer.

Musical style
Extractions was less ambient than the band's previous works while retaining the same "moody" tone.

Reception 

AllMusic called it "a gripping, involving instrumental masterpiece". Trouser Press, on the other hand, wrote: "[Dif Juz] get by on Extractions, but just barely."

Track listing
All tracks written by Dif Juz
Side One
 "Crosswinds" - 7:43
 "A Starting Point" - 3:39
 "Silver Passage" - 3:55
 "The Last Day" - 4:01
Side Two
 "Love Insane" - 3:11
 "Marooned" - 4:02
 "Two Fine Days (And a Thunderstorm)" - 2:29
 "Echo Wreck" - 4:37
 "Twin and Earth" - 4:29

Personnel 
Dif Juz
 Alan Curtis
 David Curtis
 Gary Bromley
 Richard Thomas

Additional Personnel
 Elizabeth Fraser - voice (track 5)

References

External links 
 

1985 albums
Albums produced by Robin Guthrie
4AD albums